Doris Alejandrina Gutiérrez (b. 21 August 1947) is a Honduran lawyer and politician, who is currently the Second Vice President of Honduras. She was a Representative in the National Congress of Honduras belonging to the Innovation and Unity Party. In popular Honduran culture, Gutiérrez has the nickname "The Dancing Representative."

Biography
Doris Gutiérrez was born on 21 August 1947 in Comayagüela, and is the daughter of Martha Gutiérrez and Armando Uclés Sierra, and sister to José de la Paz Herrera,. She was raised by her single mother and grandmother. Gutiérrez completed her primary studies at the Universidad José Cecilio del Valle, then graduated from the Sacred Heart Institute in Tegucigalpa as a teacher with high marks, going on to win further academic honors while studying education. She found her first teaching job in Trinidad, in the Santa Bárbara Department, and would work here for 14 years teaching. While working with organized labor she decided to enter politics and in 1995, she joined the Democratic Unification Party as the substitute deputy of Matías Fúnez.

In December 2015, Gutiérrez was awarded the Maya Award by the Mexican Institute of Evaluation.

In early March 2016, Gutiérrez announced two new projects: to have the Gualcarque river declared an area of National Heritage and to officially declare Berta Cáceres, who worked to protect the river, a national heroine and name the area after her.

In the aftermath of a 2017 student demonstration at the Faculty of Medical Sciences at the Universidad Nacional Autónoma de Honduras following the charging of Cesario Padilla, Moisés Cáceres, and Sergio Ulloa with usurpation by the Honduran Supreme Court, Gutiérrez found herself amongst other politicians accused of orchestrating the demonstration by Julieta Castellanos.

Citations

1947 births
Living people
Honduran women lawyers
20th-century Honduran lawyers
Deputies of the National Congress of Honduras
21st-century Honduran women politicians
21st-century Honduran politicians
Democratic Unification Party politicians
Innovation and Unity Party politicians
People from Tegucigalpa
Vice presidents of Honduras
Women vice presidents